Grigore-Kalev Stoicescu (born on 2 September 1965 in Constanța, Romania) is an Estonian diplomat.

He was born to a Romanian father and an Estonian mother.

From 1997 to 1999, he was Ambassador of Estonia to the United States and Canada, and later to Mexico.

References

1965 births
Ambassadors of Estonia to Canada
Ambassadors of Estonia to Mexico
Ambassadors of Estonia to the United States
Estonia 200 politicians
Estonian diplomats
Estonian people of Romanian descent
Living people
Members of the Riigikogu, 2023–2027
People from Constanța
University of Tartu alumni